Anita Lyons Bond is an American civil rights activist and academic, who became the first black woman to graduate with honors from Saint Louis University.

Bond was an advocate for education, equality, and civil rights. She was a community leader and was elected in 1974 as the president of the St. Louis Board of Education. She has lectured at many universities on Black Studies. She has achieved national attention for her courses in speech correction and her strong advocacy of equal human rights. In 2015, she was awarded an honorary PhD in humanities by St Louis University. She is a member of The Links.

References 

American civil rights activists
Living people
Saint Louis University alumni
Year of birth missing (living people)
Members of The Links